Musweswenedi, formerly Msonedi, is a village in Mashonaland Central province in Zimbabwe.

Populated places in Mashonaland Central Province